In American football, passing, along with running (also referred to as rushing), is one of the two main methods of advancing the ball down the field. Passes are typically attempted by the quarterback, but any offensive player can attempt a pass provided they are behind the line of scrimmage. To qualify as a passing play, the ball must have initially moved forward after leaving the hands of the passer; if the ball initially moved laterally or backwards, the play would instead be considered a running play. A player who catches a forward pass is a receiver, and the number of receiving yards each player has recorded in each season is a recorded stat in football games. In addition to the overall National Football League (NFL) receiving champion, league record books recognize statistics from the American Football League (AFL), which operated from 1960 to 1969 before being absorbed into the NFL in 1970, Although league record books do not recognize stats from the All-America Football Conference, another league that merged with the NFL, these statistics are recognized by the Pro Football Hall of Fame.

The NFL did not begin keeping official records until the 1932 season. The average the yards the leader has gained has increased over time – since the adoption of the 14-game season in 1961, all but one season saw the receiving leader record over 1,000 yards. No player has ever finished with over 2,000 receiving yards in a season; the current record is 1,964 yards, set by Calvin Johnson during the 2012 season. Wes Chandler, who led the league with 1,032 yards in the strike-shortened 1982 season, averaged 129 yards receiving per game, an NFL record.

Don Hutson led the league in receiving yards seven times, the most of any player; Jerry Rice is second with six. Hutson also recorded the most consecutive seasons leading the league in receiving, doing so for five seasons from 1941 to 1945, while Jerry Rice ranks second with three consecutive league-leading seasons from 1993 to 1995. A Green Bay Packers player has led the league in receiving yards eleven times, the most in the NFL; the Los Angeles/St. Louis Rams rank second with nine league-leading seasons. The most recent receiving yards leader was Cooper Kupp of the Los Angeles Rams, who recorded 1,947 receiving yards over the 2021 season.

NFL season receiving yards leaders

Historical records for most receiving yards in one season

AAFC receiving yards leaders

AFL receiving yards leaders

See also
 List of National Football League season receiving touchdowns leaders
 List of National Football League career receiving yards leaders

Notes

References

External links
 National Football League
 250 best AFL and NFL receiving seasons

American Football League
All-America Football Conference
Receiving
receiving
National Football League lists